The Lost Crowes is a compilation album by American rock band The Black Crowes. The two-disc compilation comprises material composed and recorded during the Tall and Band sessions in 1993 and 1997, respectively. Many of the songs on Tall were early versions of songs that later appeared the 1994 album Amorica, with one appearing on the 1996 album Three Snakes And One Charm.

The album Band was recorded in 1997 but never released. In its place the band recorded and released By Your Side in 1998.

Originally, the Lost Crowes was slated to be released in late August 2006, but was pushed back to September 26 due to a manufacturing error in which the disc art for the two albums was reversed.

Track listing

Personnel 
The Black Crowes

 Chris Robinson – vocals
 Rich Robinson – guitar
 Marc Ford – guitar
 Johnny Colt – bass
 Steve Gorman – drums
 Eddie Harsch – keyboards

Production

 Ian Cooper – mastering
The Black Crowes – producer 
Shaun Grove – engineer  (1997 sessions)
Kevin Harp – digital transfer engineer
Chris Harrison – mixer
David Leonard – engineer (1997 sessions)
Howell Luther – assistant engineer (1997 sessions)
Vincent Marshel – assistant engineer (1997 sessions)
 Jim Mitchell – engineer (1994 sessions)
 Sean Odwyer – assistant engineer (1994 sessions)
Jamie Selway – mixer
Paul Stacey – mixer (disc one only)

Charts

References

The Black Crowes compilation albums
2006 compilation albums
American Recordings (record label) compilation albums